Klage can refer to:
 German poem or song expressing grief; lament or dirge
 The Nibelungenklage, a Middle High German heroic poem
 Diu Klage, a Middle High German poem by Hartmann von Aue, also called Das Büchlein.